KARX (107.1 FM), branded as "107.1 Nash Icon", is a radio station serving the Amarillo, Texas, area with a country music format. This station broadcasts on FM frequency 107.1 MHz and is under ownership of Cumulus Media. Its studios are located at the Amarillo Building downtown on Polk Street, and its transmitter tower is based midway between Amarillo and Canyon proper along I-27 in unincorporated Randall County.

The station is an affiliate of the Dallas Cowboys radio network.

On January 15, 2018, the then-KPUR-FM switched formats with KARX and changed its name from "107.1 The Armadillo" to "107.1 Nash Icon". The stations swapped call signs on January 24, 2018, with KPUR-FM picking up the KARX call sign.

References

External links

Country radio stations in the United States
ARX (FM)
Radio stations established in 1983
1983 establishments in Texas
Cumulus Media radio stations